William Arthur Summerhill (July 9, 1915 – October 29, 1978) was a Canadian ice hockey forward who played 72 games in the National Hockey League for the Montreal Canadiens and Brooklyn Americans between 1938 and 1942. The rest of his career, which lasted from 1938 to 1951, was mainly spent in the minor International American Hockey League|American Hockey League. He was born in Toronto, Ontario.

Career statistics

Regular season and playoffs

External links

1915 births
1978 deaths
Brooklyn Americans players
Buffalo Bisons (AHL) players
Canadian ice hockey forwards
Cleveland Barons (1937–1973) players
Fort Worth Rangers players
Montreal Canadiens players
New Haven Eagles players
New Haven Ramblers players
Ontario Hockey Association Senior A League (1890–1979) players
Portland Eagles players
Ice hockey people from Toronto
Springfield Indians players